Catherine of Brandenburg-Küstrin (10 August 1549 – 30 September 1602) was a Margravine of Brandenburg-Küstrin by birth and Electress of Brandenburg by marriage.

Life
Catherine was the younger of two daughters of John, Margrave of Brandenburg-Küstrin (1513–1571) from his marriage to Catherine (1518–1574), daughter of Henry II, Duke of Brunswick-Wolfenbüttel.

On 8 January 1570, she married Joachim of Brandenburg, later Elector Joachim III Frederick of Brandenburg (1546–1608) in Küstrin.  Due to the marriage, her husband no longer had a legitimate claim on the position of bishop of the Catholic Archdiocese of Magdeburg and Pope Pius V put in a request to Emperor Maximilian for his dismissal.

Catherine tried to improve the fate of the poor and the needy.  She built a dairy in Wedding and sold its produce on the Molkenmarkt ("Milk Market"), a square in Berlin. She used the proceeds to finance a pharmacy in the Stadtschloss that provided medicine free of charge to those in need.

Catherine died on 30 September 1602.  On 13 October, she was buried in the Hohenzollern crypt (now part of the Berliner Dom).

Descendants
From her marriage with Joachim Frederick, Catherine had the following children:
 John Sigismund, Elector of Brandenburg (8 November 1572 – 23 December 1619), Elector of Brandenburg
 married in 1594 Priness Anna of Prussia (1576–1625)
 Anne Catherine (26 June 1575 – 29 March 1612)
 married King Christian IV of Denmark (1577–1648)
 Daughter (1576–1576)
 John George, Duke of Jägerndorf (16 December 1577 – 2 March 1624)
 married Eva Christina of Württemberg (1590 - 1657), daughter of Frederick I, Duke of Württemberg and Sibylla of Anhalt
 August Frederick (16 February 1580 – 23 April 1601)
 Albert Frederick (29 April 1582 – 3 December 1600)
 Joachim (13 April 1583 – 10 June 1600)
 Ernest (13 April 1583 – 18 September 1613)
 Barbara Sophie (16 November 1584 – 13 February 1636)
 married in 1609 Duke John Frederick of Württemberg (1582–1628)
 Daughter (1585 – 1586)
 Christian William (28 August 1587 – 1 January 1665) Archbishop and later Administrator of Magdeburg
 married firstly, in 1615, Princess Dorothea of Brunswick-Wolfenbüttel (1596–1643)
 married secondly, in 1650, Countess Barbara Eusebia of Martinice (d. 1656)
 married thirdly, in 1657, Countess Maximiliane of Salm-Neuburg (1608–1663)

References and sources
 
 Ernst Daniel Martin Kirchner: Die Kurfürstinnen und Königinnen auf dem Throne der Hohenzollern, part 2: Die letzten acht Kurfürstinnen, Berlin, 1867, pp. 68–106.
 Ludwig Hahn: Geschichte des preussischen Vaterlandes, W. Hertz, 1858, p. 132
 Adolf Müller: Preußens Ehrenspiegel, Gebauer, 1851, p. 65

Footnotes

External links 
 Portrait of Catherine of Brandenburg-Küstrin in Google books
 

House of Hohenzollern
1549 births
1602 deaths
People from Kostrzyn nad Odrą
Electresses of Brandenburg
Burials at Berlin Cathedral
Daughters of monarchs